The 1969 Gran Premio de Mexico (Mexican Grand Prix) was a Formula One motor race held at the Ciudad Deportiva Magdalena Mixhuca, Mexico City on October 19, 1969, two weeks after the United States Grand Prix at Watkins Glen. It was race 11 of 11 in both the 1969 World Championship of Drivers and the 1969 International Cup for Formula One Manufacturers. The 65-lap race was won by McLaren driver Denny Hulme after he started from fourth position. Jacky Ickx finished second for the Brabham team and his teammate Jack Brabham came in third.

Report

Entry

A total of 17 F1 cars were entered for this event, the last of the season. Team Lotus had had mixed fortunes at Watkins Glen, although Jochen Rindt had won the race, his teammate Graham Hill had broken both legs in an accident. At this event, Lotus decided not to replace him. However they did run a second car, a Lotus 63 developmental car with four wheel drive for John Miles, as Mario Andretti was busy winning the Dan Gurney 200 at Pacific Raceways, USA.

The rest of the field was unchanged, with only one Ferrari 312 entered by NART for local hero, Pedro Rodríguez.

Qualifying

The Motor Racing Developments Ltd team proved to be very fast in Mexico, as they dominated qualifying in their Brabham-Cosworth BT26A. Jack Brabham secured pole position, for the team, averaging a speed of 96.087 mph. Next fastest was his teammate, Jacky Ickx. The 1969 World Champion, Jackie Stewart was third fastest in his Matra-Cosworth MS80, who shared the second row with the McLaren-Cosworth M7A of Denny Hulme. A pair of Lotus 49s were on row three, with Jo Siffert ahead of Jochen Rindt.

Race

The race was held over 65 laps, however, for the second consecutive race, Bruce McLaren failed to make the start. Of the 16 remaining cars, Jackie Stewart made the best start, with the Brabhams of Jacky Ickx and Jack Brabham in pursuit, Jochen Rindt fourth, and Denny Hulme close behind. By the end of the second lap, led, while Ickx was putting pressure on Stewart. By lap six, Ickx was through, into the lead, and Hulme past Brabham to take third. Hulme overtook Stewart on the next lap, and set about chasing down Ickx.  On lap 10, Hulme's McLaren was ahead. Meanwhile, Stewart’s Matra had dropped behind Brabham, and this is how the top four remained throughout the remainder of the race. Rindt ran fifth early on in the race, but bent his suspension on a curb, leading to his retirement, so fifth went to Jean-Pierre Beltoise, with Jackie Oliver finishing sixth in the BRM P139, two laps adrift.

Hulme finished just 2.56 seconds ahead of Ickx.

Qualifying

Qualifying classification

Race

Classification

Championship standings after the race

Drivers' Championship standings

Constructors' Championship standings

Note: Only the top five positions are included for both sets of standings. Only the best 5 results from the first 6 rounds and the best 4 results from the last 5 rounds counted towards the Championship. Numbers without parentheses are Championship points; numbers in parentheses are total points scored.

References

Mexican Grand Prix
Mexican Grand Prix
Mexican Grand Prix
Mexican Grand Prix